Martin Leman (born 1934) is an English artist who gained recognition for his paintings of cats. Since 1969 his works have been published in a number of books and international exhibitions.

Early life 
Martin attended art school in Worthing and the Central School of Art and Design in Holborn. He also spent time in Egypt on National Service duties.

Career 
Before starting his painting career in 1969 he worked as a graphic designer and taught at various institutions across London. His works on the subject of cats have appeared in over 20 books. He was elected as a member of the Royal Society of British Artists in 2007 and is also a member of the Royal Watercolour Society. As well as cats his works have focused on portraits of women and areas of Cornwall which have featured as a backdrop to much of his output.

References 

20th-century English painters
1934 births
Living people
Painters from London